Sir Bevil Grenville (23 March 1596 - 5 July 1643) was an English landowner  and soldier who sat as a Member of Parliament for various constituencies between 1620 to 1642, although during those years there were few parliamentary sessions. When the First English Civil War broke out in August 1642, he joined the Royalists and played a leading role in their early campaigns in the West Country. He was killed in action at the Battle of Lansdowne in 1643.

Early life
Bevil Grenville was born 23 March 1596 in Lower Brynn, near Withiel, Cornwall, eldest son of Sir Bernard Grenville (1567–1636) and Elizabeth Bevil (1564-1636), and grandson of Elizabethan hero and naval captain, Sir Richard Grenville (1542–1591). He had a younger brother, Richard (1600-1659), who later also fought for the Royalists during the Wars of the Three Kingdoms, acquiring a reputation for brutality and greed.

Grenville entered Exeter College, Oxford , in 1611, and graduated in 1614, later saying he had failed to benefit much from his time there. He spent the next four years at Court, supervised by Endymion Porter, a close friend of his father and of the future Charles I.

In 1618, Grenville married Grace Smith (died 1647), daughter of Sir George Smith, three times Mayor of Exeter and one of its wealthiest citizens, an important consideration given his father's sizeable debts. They went on to have twelve children, including Richard (born 1620, died young), John (1628–1701), Dennis (died 1702), Bernard (1631–1701), Elizabeth, Bridget, Joanna and Grace.

Early career  
In 1621, Grenville was elected as one of the two knights of the shire for Cornwall, to sit in the 3rd Parliament of James I. In 1624 he was elected again for the 4th parliament.

In 1625, the family estates at Kilkhampton were settled on Grenville in return for agreeing to settle his father's debts of £15,000. He was elected for Launceston in 1625 and retained the seat until Charles I suspended Parliament in 1629. 

While Sir Bernard backed Charles and his arbitrary policies, his son was a supporter of Sir John Eliot who was imprisoned in the Tower of London for his opposition to Personal Rule. Grenville withdrew from involvement in politics after Eliot's death in 1632, but was reconciled with his father shortly before he died in 1636 and became Deputy lieutenant of Cornwall.

Wars of the Three Kingdoms

Despite his previous opposition to Royal policies, on the outbreak of the Bishops' Wars with Scotland in 1639, Grenville raised a troop of cavalry which acted as Charles' bodyguard and was knighted for his service in 1639. When Parliament was briefly recalled in April 1640, he was re-elected for Launceston, then sat for Cornwall in the Long Parliament from November 1640 until he was suspended in September 1642.

When the First English Civil War began in August 1642, most of the West Country gentry supported the Royalist cause. Grenville helped proclaim the King's Commission of Array at Launceston, empowering them to mobilise the local Trained bands or militia. In addition, Grenville, Nicholas Slanning, William Godolphin, John Trevanion and Warwick Mohun, each recruited a regiment at their own expense,  collectively known as "the Tinners", since many of the recruits worked in local tin mines. 

The rank and file often had little choice in deciding whether to "volunteer"; Grenville, generally regarded as a benevolent landlord, threatened his tenants and employees with sanctions if they refused to sign up. While militia on both sides often refused to serve outside their own counties, the Cornish were particularly noted for their reluctance to serve outside Cornwall or under non-Cornish officers. Although regarded as some of the best infantry available to the Royalists in the West, these factors limited their usefulness. When Royalist commander Sir Ralph Hopton advanced on Plymouth after his victory at Braddock Down in January 1643, many of his troops refused to cross the River Tamar into Devon.   

At Stratton on 16 May 1643, Grenville led his men against Parliamentarian troops entrenched along the top of Stamford hill. After eight hours of fighting, the Royalists were nearly out of ammunition and a counter attack led by James Chudleigh knocked over Grenville and briefly caused his troops to waver; however, they quickly rallied and cut down their opponents using pikes and clubs. Shortly after this, the Parliamentarians were in headlong flight, a victory which secured Cornwall for the Royalists. Their advance into Devon, then Somerset, led to the Battle of Lansdowne on 5 July, near Bath. Grenville led his regiment in a successful charge against Parliamentarian positions on Lansdowne Hill, then formed a defensive line and held his ground despite a series of counterattacks by the Parliamentarian cavalry. 

In the course of this, Grenville was hit in the head with a pole-axe and carried to the rectory at nearby Cold Ashton, where he died of his wounds next day. His friend John Trevelyan later wrote to his wife Grace that he "died an honourable death...fighting with invincible valour and loyalty for his God, his King and his Country". His servant Anthony Payne brought his body back to Kilkhampton, and he was buried in the parish church of St James on 26 July.

Legacy

 
His grandson George Granville, 1st Baron Lansdown became Secretary at War in the Tory government of 1710 to 1712 and took the title "Baron Lansdown" in a reference to his heroic grandfather. Shortly before the succession of George I in 1714, he erected an elaborate monument to Sir Bevil in the Granville Chapel, a reminder of his family's loyalty to the House of Stuart. Like many Tories, exclusion from office after 1715 embittered Granville and he became a Jacobite, being held in the Tower of London from 1715 to 1717 and allegedly involved in the 1722 Atterbury Plot. The erection of Sir Bevil Grenville's Monument in 1720 was another reference to his family history.

Footnotes

References

Sources
 
 
 
 
 
 
 
 
 
 
 
 

 
 

 

1596 births
1643 deaths
Cavaliers
Alumni of Exeter College, Oxford
People from Kilkhampton
Politicians from Cornwall
Burials in Cornwall
English military personnel killed in action
Military personnel from Cornwall
Members of the pre-1707 English Parliament for constituencies in Cornwall
English MPs 1621–1622
English MPs 1625
English MPs 1626
English MPs 1628–1629
English MPs 1640 (April)
English MPs 1640–1648
Bevil
People killed in the English Civil War
Royalist military personnel of the English Civil War
Deputy Lieutenants of Cornwall
English army officers
Knights Bachelor